Renegades of the Sage is a 1949 American Western film directed by Ray Nazarro and written by Earle Snell. The film stars Charles Starrett, Smiley Burnette, Leslie Banning, Trevor Bardette, Douglas Fowley and Jock Mahoney. The film was released on November 24, 1949, by Columbia Pictures.

Plot

Cast          
 Charles Starrett as Steve Duncan / The Durango Kid
 Smiley Burnette as Smiley Burnette
 Leslie Banning as Ellen Miller
 Trevor Bardette as Miller
 Douglas Fowley as Sloper
 Jock Mahoney as Lt. Hunter 
 Fred F. Sears as Lt. Jones 
 Jerry Hunter as Johnny
 Selmer Jackson as Brown
 George Chesebro as Worker
 Frank McCarroll as Drew

References

External links
 

1949 films
1949 Western (genre) films
American Western (genre) films
American black-and-white films
Columbia Pictures films
1940s English-language films
Films directed by Ray Nazarro
1940s American films